Yubeshi is a type of wagashi (Japanese confection). It has several flavor and shape variations, most commonly walnuts or Japanese citrus (usually yuzu), and can be round or square, but all yubeshi has a base of sticky rice or rice flour, sugar and soy sauce. The process of production is very labor-intensive. A circle is cut out of the top of the yuzu and set aside. A wooden spatula removes the fruit and scrapes away the white pith of the yuzu, leaving only the zest. The fruit is then stuffed with a filling which can range from plain mochiko flour to a traditional blend of mochiko, shōyu, and other spices. The reserved top of the fruit is placed back in as a cap, and the whole thing is steamed repeatedly until the fruit is shiny and brown and the mochi has fully gelatinized. The longer the product is stored, the harder the texture will become. Both the rind and filling are edible. Yubeshi can be served in many ways, whether sliced thin on top of rice dishes and salad, or softened in a warm soup dish.

References

External links
http://city.sendai.jp/kankou/product/yubeshi-e.html

Wagashi